Rabbi Yosef Yehudah Leib Bloch was a prominent rabbi and rosh yeshiva in Telshe (Telšiai), Lithuania.

Early life 

Rabbi Bloch was born on February 13, 1860, in Raseiniai, Lithuania, then part of the Russian Empire, to Mordechai and Sara Basya Bloch. As a child of five, he was already learning Chumash and by the age of seven, he was studying Talmud with the commentaries of Rashi and Tosafos. When he was eleven, he left home to learn in the yeshiva Rabbi Moshe Charif in Vekshena, and at the age of thirteen (or fifteen), his parents sent him to Kelmė to learn in the yeshiva of Rabbi Eliezer Gordon. Rabbi Nosson Tzvi Finkel (Slabodka), the Alter of Slabodka, was living in Kelmė at that time, and brought Yosef Leib to study by Rabbi Simcha Zissel Ziv, the Alter of Kelm. In 1881, he married Rabbi Gordon's oldest daughter, Chasya.

Rabbinic career 

In 1884, Rabbi Gordon brought Rabbi Bloch to the Telshe Yeshiva, which he headed, and in 1886, Rabbi Bloch became a teacher in the yeshiva. When he and his father-in-law introduced the study of mussar (Torah ethics) into the curriculum, and then appointed Rabbi Leib Chasman, a strong proponent of musssar, as mashgiach ruchani, many of the students rebelled, and Rabbi Bloch left the yeshiva. In 1902, he became a rabbi in Varniai, and opened a yeshiva there. Two years later, he founded a yeshiva in Shadova (Šeduva). Among his students there was Chaim Mordechai Katz, future rosh yeshiva of the Teshe Yeshiva in Cleveland.

Return to Telshe 

In 1910, Rabbi Eliezer Gordon died, and Rabbi Bloch therefore returned to Telshe, where he succeeded his father-in-law as community rabbi and rosh yeshiva. In the 1920s, to counter the influence of the Haskalah on the city's youth, he founded elementary schools for boys and girls. However, they incorporated secular studies, as opposed to a strictly Torah study-based curriculum and some criticized him for this initiative; however, he was backed by the Chofetz Chaim, one of the leaders of European Jewry at the time. Two teachers' seminaries were established, one for men (established in 1927) and one for women (established in 1930), under the name Yavneh Teachers' Seminary, to train adults to become teachers. In 1929, a kollel, called Kollel HaRabbonim, was created.

Aside from his leadership role as rabbi and rosh yeshiva in Telshe, Rabbi Bloch also served as the head of the Agudas HaRabbonim of Lithuania, and was a member and supporter of the organization, Agudath Israel. He also wrote the Sefer Shiurei Daas and Sefer Shiurei Halachah.

Rabbi Bloch died on November 10, 1929, in Telshe at the age of 69. His son, Rabbi Avraham Yitzchak Bloch, succeeded him as community rabbi as well as rosh yeshiva.

Family 

Rabbi Bloch had eight children, among them Rabbi Avraham Yitzchak Bloch, the last rosh yeshiva of Telshe in Lithuania before the Holocaust; Rabbi Shmuel Zalman Bloch, mashgiach ruchani in Telshe in Lithuania; and Rabbi Eliyahu Meir Bloch, co-founder of the Telshe Yeshiva in Cleveland. His daughter, Perel Leah, married Rabbi Chaim Mordechai Katz, later the co-founder of the Telshe Yeshiva in Cleveland with Rabbi Eliyahu Meir Bloch. His granddaughter (daughter of Rabbi Avraham Yitzchak) was Rochel Sorotzkin, a teacher in Cleveland's Yavneh Seminary and wife of Rabbi Boruch Sorotzkin, rosh yeshiva of Telshe in Cleveland.

References 

1860 births
1929 deaths
Lithuanian Orthodox rabbis
Rosh yeshivas
Authors of books on Jewish law
Writers of Musar literature
Hebrew-language writers
People from Raseiniai
Rabbis from Telšiai
19th-century Lithuanian rabbis
20th-century Lithuanian rabbis